World Championship Wrestling was an Australian professional wrestling promotion that ran from 1964 until 1978.

History
The promotion gained publicity through television programs on the Nine Network, which were presented at noon on Saturdays and Sundays.

An average of 6,500 people attended in the first three months of the promotion's existence, a crowd of 8,000 attended a show on 7 November in Melbourne when the first title change in the new promotion took place as Dominic De Nucci defeated Killer Kowalski. WCW also promoted throughout Southeast Asia, particularly in Singapore and Hong Kong.

When WCW began operations in 1964, the promotion created the International Wrestling Alliance as a sanctioning body for WCW's original championships, the IWA World Heavyweight and World Tag Team Championships. WCW joined the National Wrestling Alliance in August 1969, but they continued to recognize the IWA World championships until 1971, when they were abandoned in favor of new NWA-sanctioned titles (see below).

In 1978, the Nine Network ceased coverage of WCW; with no TV coverage promoters were facing financial ruin, leading to the decline of professional wrestling in Australia. The "World Championship Wrestling" name was reused in 1982 by Georgia Championship Wrestling in the United States for its own TV program, which became the roots of the American promotion of the same name. At the time, the promotion's former owner, Jim Barnett, was one of the owners of Georgia Championship Wrestling.

Documentaries about the promotion were released in 2007 called Ruff, Tuff N Real and Over the Top Rope in 2017.

Roster

 Abdullah the Butcher
 Alex Iakovidis
 Allan Pinfold
 "Amazing Antonino Argentino" Rocca
 André the Giant
 Andreas Lambrakis
 Angelo "Little Jumping Joe" Savoldi
 Antonio Pugliese
 Apache Bull Ramos
 Art Nelson
 Big Bad John
 Blackjack Slade
 Brute Bernard
 Bugsy McGraw
 Bulldog Brower
 Bruiser Brody
 Bruno Sammartino
 Butcher Brannigan
 Bobby Shane
 Bob Blassie
 Bob Ragan
 Bob Roop
 Ciclón Negro
 Chief Big Heart
 Chief Billy White Wolf
 Clyde Steeves
 Con Dandos
 Con Tolios
 "Cowboy" Bob Ellis
 Czaya Nandor
 Dale Lewis
 Dennis McCord
 Dennis Stamp
 Dick Dunn
 Dick Murdoch
 Dominic De Nucci
 Don Carson
 Donna Christianello
 Dr. Jerry Graham
 Dusty Rhodes
 Efride Dengler
 El Greco
 Evelyn Stevens
 George Barnes
 George Gouliovas
 George Julio
 George Lackey
 George Trikilis
 The Golden Terror
 The Great Mephisto
 Hans Schroeder
 Harley Race
 "Haystacks" Calhoun
 Jack Claybourne
 Jack Brisco
 Jerry Brisco
 Jan Jansen
 Jimmy Golden
 John da Silva
 John Tolios
 Johnny Gray
 Kevin Martin
Ken Medlin 
 Killer Karl Kox
 Killer Kowalski
 King Curtis Iaukea
 Larry Hennig
 Larry O'Dea
 Lars Anderson
 Len Holt
 Les Roberts
 Lorenzo Parente
 Lou Liotta
 Mario Milano
 Mark Lewin
 Max Steyne
 Max Tamboola
 Michael Cleary
 The Missouri Mauler
 Moose Morowski
 Murphy the Surfie
 Mr. Fuji
 Mr Wrestling
 Nikita Kalmikoff
 Ox Baker
 Pat Barrett Paddy
 Pat Patterson
 Paulette Giret
 Peter Scalise
 Peter Spence
 "Playboy" Gary Hart
 Ray Stevens
 Red Bastien
 Ricky Wallace
 Ripper Collins
 Ron Miller
 Roy Heffernan
 Sheik Wadi Ayoub
 Skandor Akbar
 Skull Murphy
 Sonny Dalton 
 Spike Robson
 Spiros Arion
 The Spoiler
 Steve Hardy
 Steve Rackman
 The Medics (Bob Griffin and Dale Lewis)
 Tiger Singh
 Tex McKenzie
 The Tojo Brothers (Hiro 'The Great' Tojo and Hito Tojo)
 Tony Kontellis
 Tony Parisi
 The Von Steiger Brothers
 Waldo Von Erich
 Ron Fuller

Championships

See also

 Professional wrestling in Australia
 List of professional wrestling organisations in Australia

References

External links
 Media Man

Australian professional wrestling promotions
Entertainment companies established in 1964
Entertainment companies disestablished in 1978
Defunct companies of Australia
Companies based in Melbourne
Professional wrestling in Australia
Sport in Melbourne
Nine's Wide World of Sport
Australian sports television series
National Wrestling Alliance members
1964 establishments in Australia
1978 disestablishments in Australia